Dionisio R. De Leon Express or simply De Leon Express was a Philippine bus company based in Tarlac City, with approximately 30 units and operations throughout Northern Luzon. It was founded and manager by its owner, Dionisio R. De Leon for which the company was named.

History 
The company started in 1998 by its owner, Dionisio R. De Leon. Using his name as the company's trade-name, his company started to operate routes from Tarlac City to San Carlos, Pangasinan with only two bus units. After seeing a good potential to expand the business, De Leon Express added to its bus fleet and expanded its routes to Dagupan, Pangasinan and Dau Bus Terminal, eventually including a direct route to Metro Manila.

However, in 2010, it was discovered by authorities that the operation in Metro Manila was "out of line". meaning that De Leon Express had no authority to provide service all the way to the metro. Their buses were also found to be aging and in need of maintenance or replacement. They were cited by the Metro Manila Development Authority as colorum vehicles: "Unregistered Subs/Replacement Engine" or bus units with no registration or needed for engine replacement due to failure upon having series of emission tests.

De Leon Express continued to operate and was eventually sold to JAC Liner, which later merged with Pangasinan Solid North Transit.

Fleet
The De Leon Express fleet included:
 Mitsubishi Fuso 8DC8 (Ordinary Fare, Almazora Travel Star Body) 
 Mitsubishi Fuso 8DC9 (Ordinary Fare, Almazora Travel Star Body) 
 Mitsubishi Fuso 6D22 (Ordinary Fare, Almazora Travel Star Body) 
 Yutong ZK6107H 
 Man Almazora Tourist Star R39

Destinations
Former routes of De Leon Express before sake to JAC Liner.
 Dagupan - Cubao via Dau TPLEX Carmen or SCTEX Concepcion
 Tarlac City - San Carlos
 San Carlos - Cubao (Via Basista/SCTEX Concepcion)
 San Carlos - Cubao (Via Malasiqui/SCTEX Concepcion)
 San Carlos - Cubao/Kamias (Via Dau SCTEX-Concepcion, Tarlac)
 Bayambang - Cubao (via Dau)
 Dau - Cubao or Aveinda

See also
Dagupan Bus Co., Inc.
JAC Liner
List of bus companies of the Philippines

References

Bus companies of the Philippines
Defunct transportation companies of the Philippines